Yognogo is a commune in the Cercle of Koutiala in the Sikasso Region of southern Mali. The commune covers an area of 66 square kilometers and includes 3 villages (Bereniakan, Famessasso, and Koumbri). In the 2009 census it had a population of 5,700. The village of Famessasso, the administrative centre (chef-lieu) of the commune, is 20 km northeast of Koutiala near the Route Nationale 13 that links Koutiala with San.

References

External links
.

Communes of Sikasso Region